Cory Denniss (born 18 June 1997) is an Australian professional rugby league footballer who plays as a  and er for the South Sydney Rabbitohs in the NRL. 

He previously played for the Newcastle Knights in the National Rugby League.

Background
Denniss was born in Belmont, New South Wales, Australia.

He played his junior rugby league for Lakes United in the Newcastle Rugby League, before being signed by the Newcastle Knights.

Playing career

2016
In 2016, Denniss played for the Newcastle Knights' NYC team. In round 3 of the 2016 NRL season, after just two games in the NYC, he was called up to make his NRL debut for the Knights against the Canberra Raiders after regular winger Akuila Uate was ruled out with injury. He scored two tries on debut. In July, he played for the New South Wales under-20s team against the Queensland under-20s team. He finished his debut season having played in 7 matches and scoring 3 tries. In November, he extended his contract with the Knights until the end of 2018.

2017
2017 was a quieter year for Denniss, spending the entirety of the season in the Knights' lower grade sides.

2018
After spending the first 12 rounds in the Knights' Intrust Super Premiership NSW side, Denniss was called up for a return to the NRL side, playing at centre against the Parramatta Eels in the Knights' 30-4 win. He parted ways with the Knights at the end of the season.

In December, Denniss signed a 2-year contract with the South Sydney Rabbitohs starting in 2019.

2019 & 2020
Denniss made no appearances for South Sydney in the 2019 NRL season and 2020 NRL season's.  On 9 November 2020, he was released by South Sydney.

References

External links
South Sydney Rabbitohs profile
Newcastle Knights profile

1997 births
Living people
Australian rugby league players
Newcastle Knights players
Lakes United Seagulls players
Rugby league centres
Rugby league wingers
Rugby league players from Newcastle, New South Wales